Guru Nanak Dev Engineering College (GNDEC or GNE Ludhiana) is one of the oldest engineering institutions of the northern region situated at Gill Park, Ludhiana, Punjab, India. The foundation stone of the college was laid on 8 April 1956 by Hon'ble Dr. Rajendra Prasad, the first President of India. The college has been named after 1st Sikh Guru Guru Nanak Dev Ji.

Campus
Campus has various amenities such as college building, auditorium, girls and boys hostels, swimming pool, sports and gymnasium hall complex, Gurudwara Sahib, bank branch, dispensary, post office and open air theatre.

Central facilities
Central library
Mechanical workshop block
Computer center
Genco alumni home
Day scholar club

Academics
The college was earlier affiliated with Panjab University, Chandigarh since beginning. But after establishment of Punjab Technical University, Jalandhar in 1997 as a single affiliating university for all technical colleges of Punjab, college became affiliated with Punjab Technical University, Jalandhar. GNE is the first Engineering College of Punjab, which was conferred Autonomous Status by University Grants Commission in 2012. The college is one of the few technical institutions of Punjab selected for World Bank financial assistance under Technical Education Quality Improvement Programme (TEQIP).

Courses offered
 Bachelor of Technology 
 Civil engineering
 Mechanical engineering
 Computer Science & Engineering
 Electrical engineering
 Electronics & Communication Engineering
 Information technology
 Production engineering
 Master of Technology 
 Computer Science and Engineering
 Industrial engineering
 Production engineering
 Power engineering
 Structural engineering
 Geotechnical engineering
 Electronics & Communication Engineering
 Environmental engineering
 B.Arch
 Master of Business Administration
 Master in Computer Applications
 Ph.D. under QIP

Reputation and rankings

GNE was ranked at place 70 among engineering colleges in India by India Today in 2020.

Admissions
 LEET for diploma holder
 Common Management Admission Test (CMAT) for admissions to postgraduate degree program in Management (MBA)
 Graduate Aptitude Test in Engineering (GATE) as well as through B.Tech merit, as per Punjab Technical University guidelines for admissions in M.Tech

Campus placements and industrial interaction
The college has an impeccable placement record of students in reputed companies since its inception. The college has tie-ups and signed MoUs with many industrial and research institutes. The college also runs very active testing and industrial consultancy cell, which provides consultation to a large number of Govt. and industrial houses.

Student activities

Festivals
GENESIS is the annual cultural and arts festival held in February or March
ATHARVA is the annual Technical festival held in September or October and invites participants from various renowned colleges of North India.

Professional societies
Chapters of the following professional bodies have been established at the college.
 Association of Civil Engineering Students(ACES)
 Society of Automotive Engineers
 Indian Society for Technical Education
 Computer Society of India (CSI)
 Linux User Group
 Helps welfare society

NSS/NCC
An NSS wing and an NCC wing has been established.

Academic extension 
 Guru Nanak Dev Polytechnic College, Ludhiana
 Science & Technology Entrepreneurs’ Park (STEP-GNDEC)
 Centre for Development of Rural Technology (CDRT)
 Nankana Sahib Public School, Gill Road, Ludhiana

Notable people

GNE graduates (Genconians) have found success in a variety of diverse fields including cultural, political, public and private sectors in India and abroad. Various Alumni chapters of college are active around the world. The list contains many people including faculty members and Alumni.
Sukh Dhaliwal (CE-1983)
Nazar Singh Manshahia, MLA (Mansa), Aam Aadmi Party (CE-1982)
Sidhu Moose Wala alias Shubdeep Singh Sidhu (EE-2016)
Gurpartap Singh Wadala (EE-1985)
Baldev Singh Sra, CMD, PSPCL (EE-1982)

See also

 List of places named after Guru Nanak Dev
 Centre of Excellence for Farm Machinery (erstwhile MERADO)
 Punjab Engineering College, Chandigarh
 Birla Institute of Technology – Science and Technology Entrepreneurs' Park
 Village Gill

References

External links
 
 GENCO alumni website 
 T&P Cell, GNE
 Punjab Technical University website

Engineering colleges in Punjab, India
Education in Ludhiana
Science and technology in Ludhiana
Educational institutions established in 1956
Memorials to Guru Nanak
1956 establishments in East Punjab